was a Japanese freelance writer and Zen monk.

Hirohito was a researcher of Japanese graves and missionary history in South America with a focus on Peru. He was the Japanese editor for the Japanese-language Peru newspaper Peru Shinpō. He graduated from Kokugakuin University with a degree in Shintō studies. He was devoted to the study of Suika Shintō, a branch of Shintō developed by Yamazaki Ansai, religious sociality, and the religious activities of Lafcadio Hearn.

Many of his articles dealt with Japanese Peruvians, Japanese Buddhism, and Peruvians in Japan.

Publications
Sōtōshū Jion-ji (perū kyōwakoku) ihai list
Shirarezaru Nihonjin
Nombres en japonés - Nihongo no Namae

External links
Interview with Hirohito Ota in The Japan Times
Obituary

1970 births
2018 deaths
Japanese writers